Showtime is the second album by Angel & Khriz released on March 11, 2008. It was a success with fans and critics, receiving 4.5 stars from AllMusic and reaching No. 18 on the Billboard Top Latin Albums chart.

Showtime was nominated for a Lo Nuestro Award for Urban Album of the Year.

Track listing
Intro
Que Nos Vean 
La Vecina 
Showtime (featuring Zion) 
Muévela 
Juguete 
Tu Aroma
Na De Na (featuring Gocho & John Eric) 
He Tratado 
Quiere Más 
Me Pegué - (featuring Montana & Mora) 
No Me Conoces 
Pa'l Barrio 
Va y Ven  
Carita de Ángel (Version Bachata) (Remix)
Carita de Ángel (Album Version) (On the 16 tracks edition)

Charts

References

External links
New Album: Angel & Khriz - Showtime

2008 albums
Angel & Khriz albums
Machete Music albums
Albums produced by Noriega
Albums produced by Nely